Dielis plumipes, the feather-legged scoliid wasp, is a species of scoliid wasp in the family Scoliidae.

References

External links

 

Scoliidae